Hägersten SK was a Swedish football club located in Hägersten within the borough of Hägersten-Liljeholmen.In 2018, they merged with Mälarhöjdens IK to become Mälarhöjden-Hägersten FF.

Background
Hägersten SK currently plays in Division 4 Stockholm Södra which is the sixth tier of Swedish football. They play their home matches at the Hägerstensåsens BP in Hägersten.

The club is affiliated to Stockholms Fotbollförbund.

Season to season

Footnotes

External links
 Hägersten SK – Official website
 Hägersten SK on Facebook

Football clubs in Stockholm
1933 establishments in Sweden